Lincoln Hills School (LHS) for boys is a "type 1 secured juvenile correctional facilities" operated by the Wisconsin Department of Corrections. It is located in the unincorporated community of Irma in Lincoln County, Wisconsin. The School shares 800 acres with Copper Lake School (CLS) for girls. Lincoln Hills was constructed in 1970 and Copper Lake  in 2011.

References

External links
Wisconsin Department of Corrections

Prisons in Wisconsin
Buildings and structures in Lincoln County, Wisconsin
1970 establishments in Wisconsin
Educational institutions established in 1970